Essien may refer to:
E. U. Essien-Udom (born 1928), Nigerian professor
Emmanuel Essien, Nigerian politician
Kweku Essien (born 1984), Ghanaian footballer, currently playing for Eleven Wise
Loick Essien (born 1990), British musician
Michael Essien (born 1982), Ghanaian former footballer, currently coaching FC Nordsjælland.
Nduese Essien (born 1944), Nigerian politician
Okon Flo Essien (born 1981), Nigerian footballer, currently playing for Đồng Tâm Long An F.C.
Essien Udim, a local government area of Nigeria